Rubus bicknellii, the Nantucket blackberry, is an uncommon North American species of flowering plant in the rose family. It is found only on the Island of Nantucket. This is part of the Commonwealth (state) of Massachusetts in the northeastern United States.

The genetics of Rubus is extremely complex, so that it is difficult to decide on which groups should be recognized as species. There are many rare species with limited ranges such as this. Further study is suggested to clarify the taxonomy.

References

bicknellii
Plants described in 1941
Flora of Massachusetts
Nantucket, Massachusetts